Anya Reiss (born 1991) is a British playwright and screenwriter.

Career
The youngest writer to have a play staged in London, a graduate of the Royal Court's Young Writers Programme, she had her first play Spur of the Moment staged there in the Upstairs Jerwood Theatre in July 2010, directed by Jeremy Herrin. The play went on to win the 2010 TMA Award for Best New Play; the Evening Standard and the Critics' Circle Award for Most Promising Playwright.

Her second play The Acid Test was staged in 2011, again at the Royal Court Theatre; it was directed by Simon Godwin.

In 2012, she adapted Chekhov's The Seagull for Southwark Playhouse. She also wrote a play for the National Theatre's Connections season called Forty Five Minutes.

Reiss has also written for television. As of December 2018, she has written 27 episodes of long-running BBC drama EastEnders, including a special episode about sexual consent in 2018. She also wrote several episodes of school drama Ackley Bridge, which debuted in 2017. In 2022, her historical drama Becoming Elizabeth premiered on Starz.
The series follows the younger years of Queen Elizabeth I.

Work
Oliver Twist (2017) Regent's Park Theatre, adapted from the novel by Charles Dickens, directed by Caroline Byrne
Uncle Vanya (2014) St. James Theatre, adapted from Anton Chekhov, directed by Russell Bolam
Spring Awakening (2014) Headlong / West Yorkshire Playhouse / Nuffield, adapted from Frank Wedekind
Three Sisters (2014) Southwark Playhouse, adapted from Chekhov 
Forty Five Minutes (2013) The Shed at National Theatre
The Seagull (2012) Southwark Playhouse, adapted from Chekhov
The Acid Test (2011) Royal Court Theatre, upstairs theatre, directed by Simon Godwin
Spur of the Moment (2010) Royal Court Theatre, upstairs theatre, directed by Jeremy Herrin

References

External links
 

Living people
1991 births
British dramatists and playwrights
British women dramatists and playwrights
British soap opera writers
British television writers
People from Camberwell
Women soap opera writers
Writers from London
British women television writers